Julie Kathleen Payne is an American television, film and stage actress who, in a career lasting over four decades, has specialized primarily in comedy roles as well as voice acting.  She was a cast member in three short-lived network sitcoms during 1983–1986, and appeared in about twenty feature films and over a hundred episodes of TV series as well as providing voices for scores of TV animated shows.

Early years and start of career
A native of Oregon, Julie Payne was born in the small city of Sweet Home, near the lake and river areas adjoining the Cascade Range.  Growing up in the state's second-largest city, Eugene, she attended South Eugene High School where she performed in a number of school productions, including The Music Man, The Madwoman of Chaillot, The Lark and Once Upon a Mattress.  Graduating in 1964, she moved to California, where she attended Santa Clara University, majoring in drama, and San Francisco State University, majoring in French.  Leaving without a degree, she traveled to Europe, where she hitchhiked through various locations and, upon returning to San Francisco during the 1967 Haight-Ashbury "Summer of Love", became a member of the improvisational comedy/satire group, The Committee, remaining with it, on and off, until 1974.

During her years with The Committee, she began appearing in films (her on-screen debut occurred as part of the group's performance at the September 1969 Big Sur Folk Festival, held a month after Woodstock, and is included in the 1971 concert film, Celebration at Big Sur).

At the start of the 1970s, she was seen in bit parts, without the group, in The Strawberry Statement and The Candidate, as well as on television (The Flip Wilson Show, The Tonight Show Starring Johnny Carson, The Midnight Special, The Streets of San Francisco and others).

In 1976, two years after leaving The Committee, she and another former member of the group, Ruth Silveira, wrote and starred in People Pie, their two-woman satirical revue which they premiered in Los Angeles and took on the road, including to Eugene, its initial stop, and her first visit to the city since leaving it in 1964.

As comedy actress and voice performer

In succeeding years, Julie Payne continued to write, act and accept an ever-increasing number of voice assignments.

Between February 1983 and June 1986, she was a regular in three network series, but each lasted less than three months.  In CBS' hour-long 1983 humorous fantasy, Wizards and Warriors, she played good queen Lattinia, one of many characters in a large ensemble cast, but the special-effects-laden expensive series was a Saturday-night ratings failure, lasting only from February 26 to May 14. She also starred in "WKRP in Cincinnati" as Buffy, one of Johnny Fever's former girlfriends in season 2 episodes 1 and 2.

In 1984, she was Aggie, the mean, nasty business manager who longed to be in charge of The Duck Factory, NBC's Jim Carrey vehicle, which, again, lasted a mere few weeks, from April 12 to July 11. Similarly, CBS' 1986 sitcom, Leo & Liz in Beverly Hills, the Steve Martin-created showcase for Harvey Korman and Valerie Perrine, provided her with a showy part as ditzy/nutty maid, Lucille, but it, too, was canceled after running for a few episodes, from April 25 to June 6.

Starting in mid-1980s, television voice work began to occupy a significant amount of Payne's time. She was heard in the animated segments of The Tracey Ullman Show and provided various voices, primarily those of Dr. Liz Wilson and Lanolin in a series of specials based on the comic strip Garfield, as well as in the series Garfield and Friends and The Garfield Show.

In 1993, she played Embarcadero Bank worker Eleanor Cooke (AKA Former Smash Club cage dancer Ginger Snap) in the Full House episode "Smash Club: the Next Generation".

Approaching the fourth decade of her career, she was seen, between 2000 and 2005, in the recurring character of Larry David's acerbic mother-in-law on his HBO satirical comedy series, Curb Your Enthusiasm.

References

External links

Living people
Actresses from Eugene, Oregon
American television actresses
American voice actresses
People from Sweet Home, Oregon
Santa Clara University alumni
South Eugene High School alumni
21st-century American actresses
Year of birth missing (living people)